Jānis Vitenbergs (born May 8, 1985) is a Latvian politician, who served as the Minister of Economics of the Republic of Latvia from April 2020 until May 2021 and June 2021 until May 2022 Prior to this, he was the chairman of the Saeima national economic, rural, environmental, and regional policy committee.

Education 
In 2005, he graduated from the Latvian College of Culture as a cultural tourism guide. In 2008, he obtained a Bachelor's degree in tourism at the University of Liepaja.

Career 
In 2018, he was elected to the 13th Saeima on the KPV LV party list. In April 2021, he left KPV LV and joined the National Alliance.

References 

1985 births
Living people
People from Tukums Municipality
Who Owns the State? politicians
National Alliance (Latvia) politicians
Deputies of the 13th Saeima
Deputies of the 14th Saeima